Go Nagai's Mazinger related mechas and characters have many different toy lines, developed since Mazinger first appeared in the 1970s. Some of the most well known ones are described here.

Popy Jumbo Machinder 
Popy was a classic Japanese toy maker, creator of the Chogokin line of toys, which later folded into its parent company Bandai. When it released its Jumbo Machinder line, Mazinger Z was the first character chosen for the line. They were 22-24 inch tall, moderately articulated figures made of polyethylene. Later on, Great Mazinger and Grendizer models were made, with similar characteristics. They were also introduced in North America thanks to Mattel, who rebranded the line as Shogun Warriors.

Some Mazinger Z villains, the Mechanical Beasts, were also ported to this line, though they didn't have the same format as the hero robot, being only 19-21 inches tall and made of soft vinyl. Originally intended only to be store displays, very few specimens of these evil mecha have survived and have become a coveted (and expensive) collector's item due to their rarity. At some point, it even remained unclear if some of them had ever actually been produced. The known produced models include:

 Garada K7
 Doublas M2 (labeled as Dabulas M2 or Dagulas M2)
 Grengus C3 (or Gren-Ghost C3)
 KingDan X10
 Rockron Q9 (Rokuron Q9)
 Spartan K5

Most of the models were distinctive for having variations from the original characters, specially in their color schemes and weaponry. Many of the rescued models can be seen at the Bandai Museum.

Bandai Soul of Chogokin 

Soul of Chogokin is a popular toy line released by Bandai in 1997. Focusing mainly on classic mechas, these adult collector oriented toys are made mostly of diecast metal, with plastic parts, usually PVC or ABS. They embody the spirit of the vintage Popy and Bandai Chogokin toys of the past. The line began as Bandai was winding down their Hi-Complete Model line. The last figure in the line was meant to be Mazinger Z, but they decided to turn that prototype into the first entry of the new Soul of Chogokin line.

Among its items (that include Tetsujin 28, Gaiking, Getter Robo and Neon Genesis Evangelion) some of the most popular ones are those related to Mazinger, associated with the "GX" prefix (the "PX"  prefix is from the Soul of Popynica Series). These include:

Fewture Models Mazinger 2001
This line includes Mazinger Z, Aphrodite A ("Aflodai") and Garada K7. Promotional images including Boss Robot and Doublas M2 surfaced, but never saw release due to the cancellation of the line (Actually, these two figures finally finished trading and it is currently possible to buy them, although at a rather high price.) Released in 2001, it was meant to celebrate the 30th anniversary of Mazinger's birth. Other notable models from the same manufacturer are those related to Devilman and Getter Robo.

Designed by Taku Sato and Yasushi Nirasawa, these 12 inch models made of ABS and PVC had an exquisite level of detail, inspired in retro-styled, steampunk aesthetics, as if they had been conceived at the beginning of the 20th century, and represent a departure from the more classic representations of the robots. The Mazinger and Aphrodite models featured versions in their regular colors as well as repainted versions.

Like the Soul of Chogokin models, these were fully poseable, included a stand and several accessories. Little figurines of the pilots were among them, and Garada's pilot was Dr. Hell.

Planned for release from Fewture are the following robots:

- No.5 Boss Robot (Mazinger series)

- No.6 Doublass (Mazinger series)

- No.8 Mazinger 1969 (Mazinger series)

- No.9 Great Mazinger 1969 (Mazinger series)

Prototypes of No.5 & 6 were on site  as well as renderings of the rest, but photography of these items was prohibited. Release dates for No.5 & 6 couldn’t be given, though Fewture is hoping for an autumn release for No.8 & 9.

West Kenji Figurines 
A line of three 18 cm PVC statuettes of Sayaka Yumi, Jun Hono and Maria Fleed, showing them in their pilot suits. These figures include a stand and each character's helmet.

They have also released resin kits of both Koji Kabuto and Tetsuya Tsurugi who, like the girls, are in their pilot suits. Both of these are extremely rare as they were only sold at a special event in Japan some years ago.

Play Ful Mazinger Z 
As in many other countries of Latin America, Mazinger was extremely popular in Argentina in the 1980s. Because of the demand for merchandising, in 1985 toy manufacturer Play Ful obtained a license from Toei Animation to produce a line, but unlike other franchises (more popular in the U.S.), there were no moulds available to produce the toys, and so Play Ful had to develop their own. The resulting dolls were made of PVC and very fragile, but held a decent level of resemblance to the original characters, sometimes modifying the colors.

The first one to be made was Mazinger Z, and it featured launchable fists and a separate Hover Pilder. Subsequently, mechanical beasts Belgas V5, Brutus M3, Grengus C3 and Gelbros J3 were added to the line. These shared Mazinger's body but with different paint work and the particular traits of each mecha. Grengus C3 for example, didn't have fists but its characteristic black orbs, and these could be launched just like Mazinger's fists. Gelbros J3's left and right heads were fully articulated, and had claws instead of hands.

Aphrodite A was also included, and was probably the model that stranded the most from the original mecha. Her body was specially made and was completely different from the "male" mechas. She featured 3 pairs of breast missiles that could be fired thanks to a mechanism in her back. Jet Scrander was produced later, and also a Great Mazinger doll, which was a modified Mazinger Z.

Nowadays is quite difficult to obtain most of these toys in good conditions, since they were so fragile and had a number of accessories that could easily be lost.

Revoltech Mazinkaiser 
Revoltech is an action figure line from the Japanese company Kaiyodo. The main selling point of the line is the 'Revolver' joint, which all of the figures utilise. This gives the figures a high degree of poseability, allowing for many dynamic and varied poses. The Revoltech version of Mazinkaiser stands 12 cm tall and comes with two Kaiser Blades, a Kaiser Sword, Kaiser Scrander, and four optional hands. A display base is also included, which allows the figure to simulate a flying position.

External links 
 Article about the story of a rare Jumbo Machinder Garada K7
 Jumbo Machinder reviews, including Mazinger Villains
 Soul of Chogokin catalog, featuring Mazinger models images  
 Soul of Chogokin reviews, including Mazinger models
 Images of Fewture Models Mazinger and Aphrodite  

Action figures